Carlos Nelli (3 December 1902 – 1 January 1994) was a Brazilian athlete. He competed in the men's pole vault at the 1932 Summer Olympics.

References

External links
 

1902 births
1994 deaths
Athletes (track and field) at the 1932 Summer Olympics
Brazilian male pole vaulters
Olympic athletes of Brazil
20th-century Brazilian people